George Hastings may refer to:
George Hastings, 1st Earl of Huntingdon (1488–1544), English nobleman
George Hastings, 4th Earl of Huntingdon (1540–1604), English nobleman
George Hastings, 8th Earl of Huntingdon (1677–1705)
Sir George Hastings (died 1641), English MP for Leicester and Leicestershire
Sir George Hastings (MP for Christchurch) (c. 1588–1651), English MP for Christchurch
George Hastings (American politician) (1807–1866), US Congressman from New York's 28th District 1853–1855
George Fowler Hastings (1814–1876), Royal Navy admiral
George Hastings (MP for East Worcestershire) (1825–1917), British Member of Parliament for East Worcestershire 1880–1892
George Hastings (footballer) (1877–1956), Australian rules footballer